Włodzimierz Zagórski (7 November 1834 in eastern Galicia, Luhove near Brody, then called Chekhy – 13 February 1902 in Warsaw, Poland), pseudonymes Chochlik, Publicola (or Publikola), was a Polish writer, popular satirist, prosaist, publicist. Officer of Austrian Army.

Zagórski was an editor and author of publications in satirical magazines Chochlik (1866–1868, 1871), Różowe Domino (1882–1884, 1887–1890). Collaborator of magazines Kurier Codzienny and Słowa. Author of poems Król Salomon (1887), Wybór poezji (1899), novels Pamiętnik starego parasola (1884), Wilcze plemię (1885), short stories and humoresques. Selection of satirical works, feast and Bacchic songs Z teki Chochlika (vol. 1–2; 1882). Selection of works with the same title, selected by Julian Tuwim, published posthumously in 1953.

Further reading

References

1834 births
1902 deaths
Austrian Empire military personnel
19th-century Polish novelists
Polish male novelists
Polish publicists
Polish satirists
Polish male short story writers
Polish short story writers
19th-century short story writers
19th-century Polish male writers